Rosalind Sarah Myers  is a fictional character from the BBC television series Spooks, which follows the exploits of Section D, a counter-terrorism division in MI5. She is portrayed by British actress Hermione Norris. The character was a former MI6 officer who joins MI5 in the fifth series.

Role in Spooks
Ros Myers was born in 1973. She is introduced in the first episode of the fifth series as an MI6 officer working under Michael Collingwood. In the same episode, Section D learns that Collingwood is plotting a conspiracy to overrule the Prime Minister, and launch measures to combat terrorism, at the cost of several civil liberties. In the second episode, Ros learns that her father, Sir Jocelyn Myers, is funding the conspiracy, and she persuades him out of it, as the rest of the team stop Collingwood. At the end of the episode, Adam Carter (Rupert Penry-Jones) offers her a position in Section D, which she takes. In the fourth episode, she is angered to learn that despite Harry Pearce's (Peter Firth) promise of going easy on her father, he is instead sentenced to 20 years imprisonment.

In the first episode of the sixth series, fellow officer Zafar Younis (Raza Jaffrey) is kidnapped by mercenaries. When she hears that French Intelligence have a lead on his whereabouts, Adam gives her 24 hours. However, it is revealed the lead was a ruse and she is kidnapped by a shadow organisation known as Yalta which has agents in governments and judiciaries in the whole world. Opposed to American hegemony in the world, they support its enemies such as the Russians and, more recently, the Iranians. They torture her as a way of recruiting her; they also convince her that the United States government is manipulating the United Kingdom during peace deals with Iran. Towards the end of the series, Section D and the CIA are made aware of Yalta. In the eighth episode, CIA liaison Bob Hogan (Matthew Marsh) begins to systematically kill known members. Ros reveals herself as a member to Section D, but wants to help them in stopping Yalta's plans, which is revealed to be setting off a logic bomb against the American defense satellite network. Though Adam and Malcolm Wynn-Jones (Hugh Simon) stop the attack, one of Yalta's high-ranking members, Juliet Shaw (Anna Chancellor) supposedly kills Ros for her betrayal by injecting her with poison. During her funeral however, Adam revives her and reveals he switched the poison with a sedative to fake her death beforehand. In the end of the episode, Ros walks away with a new identity to protect herself from further Yalta retribution.

In the seventh series, which takes place six months after series six, Ros is revealed to be working in Moscow as "Range Finder", to bring intelligence back to London which reveals a planned attack during a Remembrance Day ceremony. Adam finds a car rigged to explode and drives it to an unpopulated zone, but dies as he exits the exploding car. In the next episode, Harry promotes Ros to succeed Adam as Chief of Section D. In later episodes of the series, Ros works to uncover an FSB mole within the section, who is attempting to sabotage "Sugar Horse", a top secret MI5 operation involving the recruitment of Russians into top government positions, and therefore, become aware of Russia's intentions towards the United Kingdom. Ros and the team later discover the mole is Connie James (Gemma Jones), and she is arrested. However, in the finale, she and Lucas North (Richard Armitage) are forced to use her help when they discover "Tiresius", Russia's equivalent of Sugar Horse, has planted a nuclear bomb in London. After finding the bomb, Connie disarms it, but dies in the process.

In episode three of the eighth series, following a hostage situation, Ros kills a terrorist before he can detonate a bomb. However, because Jo Portman (Miranda Raison) held on to the terrorist, the bullet passed through him and entered her chest, killing Jo as well. Ros has since been affected by it. In the fifth episode, she is contacted by Jack Colville, her recruiter into MI6. Later in the episode, Colville finds a way to hack into MI5's records through Ros' account to kill every officer responsible for the death of Mina, his love in Bosnia several years before. To stop Colville, Ros has her name planted as the one who ordered Mina's death. Jack pursues Ros and, as he is about to kill her, she reveals the truth. Realizing that it was not the agents, but the system that was wrong, he kills himself. In the series eight finale, a multinational shadow organisation, Nightingale, attempts to cause a nuclear war between India and Pakistan. To put a stop to it, Ros and Lucas attempt to rescue a paralysed Pakistani President Mudasser and Home Secretary Andrew Lawrence (Tobias Menzies) from a hotel rigged to explode. As Lucas rescues Mudasser, Ros struggles to pull Lawrence to safety, and is still inside as the hotel explodes, resulting in their deaths. In the first episode of the ninth series it is revealed that former Home Secretary Nicholas Blake ordered the bombing; in revenge, Harry travels to his home in Scotland and kills him by poisoning his whisky.

She was succeeded as Chief of Section D by Lucas North who had previously served as Chief of Section D in the late 90s before Tom Quinn.

Reception 
The character has been well received by critics; Guardian journalist Gareth McLean wrote during the broadcast of Spooks seventh series that "Not only is Ros Myers the best character that Spooks has ever had [...] she's also the best female character currently on television." On the website of The Stage, Scott Matthewman concurred with McLean, writing, "She is indeed one of the hottest female characters on television at the moment."

For her part in the series, Hermione Norris won the Best Actress award at the inaugural Crime Thriller Awards in 2008. She was nominated in the same category the next year.

References

External links
Ros Myers at BBC.co.uk

Television characters introduced in 2006
Fictional members of secret societies
Fictional British secret agents
Fictional people from London
Fictional secret agents and spies
Spooks (TV series) characters